Shane Dunlap was the original lead singer for Ernie Haase & Signature Sound, a Southern Gospel quartet. Prior to that, he was a founding member of N'Harmony.  After leaving Signature Sound, he started a solo career.

In 2008, he formed a new group and resumed the N'Harmony name. The new N'Harmony's original lineup was tenor Brent Mitchell, lead Shane Dunlap, baritone Chris Whitaker, and bass Will Van Wygarden. Whitaker left in early 2009; at this point, Dunlap moved to baritone, and Josh Feemster came on board as lead singer.  He also replaced Ivan Parker as lead singer of "The Trio" With Kirk Talley and Anthony Burger for a short time before Burgers passing.

Shane now serves as the Worship Pastor at Lee Park Church in Monroe, NC where he leads worship and is the featured vocalist each Sunday.

References

Living people
American male singers
American gospel singers
Southern gospel performers
Year of birth missing (living people)